The Tonga Nurses' Association (TNA) is a trade union in Tonga. It is affiliated with the International Trade Union Confederation.

References

Trade unions in Tonga
International Trade Union Confederation
Nursing organizations
Medical and health organisations based in Tonga